Carlos Santos (born 1 January 1940) is a Filipino archer. He competed in the men's individual event at the 1972 Summer Olympics.

References

External links
 

1940 births
Living people
Filipino male archers
Olympic archers of the Philippines
Archers at the 1972 Summer Olympics
Place of birth missing (living people)